Soundview Manor is a historic home located on four acres in White Plains, Westchester County, New York. Built in 1920 by landowner Robert B. Dula, and is a stuccoed, frame building in the Classical Revival style.  It is "L"-shaped and has a three-story, three-bay central section flanked by two-story, one-bay blocks on each side.  The house has flat roofs, with prominent balustrades.  The flat roofed front porch is supported by Tuscan order columns.

It was added to the National Register of Historic Places in 2009.

See also
National Register of Historic Places listings in southern Westchester County, New York

References

Houses on the National Register of Historic Places in New York (state)
Neoclassical architecture in New York (state)
Houses completed in 1920
Houses in Westchester County, New York
Buildings and structures in White Plains, New York
National Register of Historic Places in Westchester County, New York